Steinhöring is a community in the Upper Bavarian district of Ebersberg.

Geography 
Steinhöring lies in the Munich Region. It lies in the south-east of the Ebersberger Forst (forest) which is one of the largest continuous area of woodlands in Germany.

It includes two traditional rural land units (Gemarkungen in German) named Sankt Christoph and Steinhöring.

Neighbouring communities are Ebersberg, Hohenlinden and Frauenneuharting.

Subdivisions 
Steinhöring is divided into many boroughs:

Sankt Christoph and Tulling; Abersdorf, Berg, Endorf, Hintsberg, Schützen und Sensau; the hamlets Aschau, Au, Dichtlmühle, Dietmering, Elchering, Etzenberg, Graben, Höhenberg, Holzhäusln, Kraiß, Niederaltmannsberg, Oberseifsieden, Ötzmann, Rupertsdorf, Schechen, Sprinzenöd, Unterseifsieden, Wall, Welling, Winkl and Zaißing as well as the housing-groups of Blöckl, Buchschechen, Helletsgaden, Hofstett, Hub, Lehen, Lieging, Mayrhof, Meiletskirchen, Neuhardsberg, Oed, Oelmühle, Ranhartsberg, Salzburg, Schätzl, Schweig, Stinau, Thailing, Untermeierhof and Winkl b. Sankt Christoph.

History 
The community’s first documentary mention was in 824. By the 16th century, Steinhöring boasted a regionally important postal station.

In 1936, the Nazi racial organization Lebensborn’s first “Mother-Child-Home” (Mutter-Kind-Heim) was opened in Steinhöring.

In the course of administrative reforms in Bavaria, the current community came into being with the community edict in 1818. In 1972, the former community of St. Christoph was amalgamated with Steinhöring.

Population development 
The community’s land area was home to 2,395 inhabitants in 1970, 3,068 in 1987 and 3,540 in 2000.

Politics 
The mayor (Bürgermeister) is Martina Lietsch (FLS). The municipal council consists of 16 politicians.
 
The community’s tax revenue for 2010 was  €2,545,000, of which €392,000 was business taxes.

Coat of arms 
Steinhöring’s arms might heraldically be described thus: Party per fess, above in argent a half ibex rampant sable, below in azure a horizontal postal horn argent.

Education 
In 2010, the following institutions existed in Steinhöring:
Kindergartens: 3 Kindergartens with, 1 of them integrates also handicapped children and works on basis of Montessori pedagogics
Elementary school
School for handicapped children

References

External links 
 

Ebersberg (district)